Abdul Karim Mustaghni (July 11, 1911 – January 13, 2004) was an Afghan scientist and politician. Mustaghni was Defense Minister of Afghanistan from 1973 to 1977. Mustaghni assisted Mohammed Daoud Khan in the 1973 bloodless coup against the monarchy of Mohammed Zahir Shah.  Zahir and his ministers were aware of a possible coup plot, but Mustaghni, fully aware of the plans, misled them into believing that the coup would occur months later, allowing the coup to occur while Zahir and several of his key ministers were out of country.

Mustaghni was the son of Abdul Ali Mustaghni.

References

1911 births
2004 deaths
Afghan scientists
Defence ministers of Afghanistan